Philip Roth (July 6, 1930 – July 15, 2002) was an American television and film actor.

Roth appeared in over twenty television shows and movies beginning in 1961 with a small role in an episode of Tallahassee 7000. He had roles in several notable films of the early 1970s, such as What's Up, Doc? where he played 'Mr Jones', Catch-22 as 'Doctor', One Flew Over the Cuckoo's Nest as 'Woolsey', and Harry and Tonto as 'Vegas Gambler'. He also had roles in numerous smaller films as well as several TV shows such as The Monkees as 'Howard Needleman,' Tales from the Dark Side as 'Sam Larchmont/Wilson Farber' as well as Cagney and Lacey as 'Sullivan'.

Roth served in the U.S. Army during World War II.

Filmography

References

External links

 at the New York Times

1930 births
2002 deaths
American male film actors
American male television actors
Male actors from Kansas City, Missouri
20th-century American male actors